John Edward Ince (August 29, 1878 – April 10, 1947), also credited as John E. Ince, was an American stage and motion pictures actor, a film director, and the eldest brother of Thomas H. Ince and Ralph Ince. John Ince became a member of The Lambs Club in 1919 like his brother Ralph, who had joined in 1916.

A leading man from the early 1910s, he also directed and scripted several of his own vehicles. Concentrating almost exclusively on directing from 1915 through 1928, Ince returned before the cameras as a character actor in the early years of the talkies.

Selected filmography

 The Battle of Shiloh (1913) - Frank Carey
 The Cowardly Way (1915, director)
 The Planter (1917, co-director)
 Secret Strings (1918, director)
 A Favor To A Friend (1919)
 Blind Man's Eyes (1919, director)
 Blackie's Redemption (1919, director)
 One-Thing-at-a-Time O'Day (1919, director)
 Old Lady 31 (1920, director)
 Held In Trust (1920, director)
 Passion Fruit (1921)
 The Hole in the Wall (1921)
 The Love Trap (1923, director)
 The Girl of Gold (1925, director)
 The Great Jewel Robbery (1925, director)
 Her Big Adventure (1926, director)
 Hour of Reckoning (1927)
 Wages of Conscience (1927)
 Hot Curves (1930)
 Air Eagles (1931)
 Is There Justice? (1931)
 Wild West Whoopee (1931)
 Headin' for Trouble (1931)
 Sheer Luck (1931)
 Guns for Hire (1932)
 Temptation's Workshop (1932)
 Passport to Paradise (1932)
 Exposed (1932)
 Human Targets (1932)
 No Living Witness (1932)
 The Thrill Hunter (1933)
 Alimony Madness (1933)
 Ship of Wanted Men (1933)
 Behind the Green Lights (1935)
 Million Dollar Haul (1935)
 Lawless Range (1935)
 In Old Kentucky (1935)
 Modern Times (1936) - warden
 The Speed Reporter (1936)
 Way Out West (1937)
 Special Agent K-7 (1937)
 Squadron of Honor (1938)
 Mr. Celebrity (1941)
 Code of the Outlaw (1942)
 Wilson (1944) - Senator Watson
 Girls of the Big House (1945)

References

External links

brief article on John Ince as a Laurel & Hardy player

American male silent film actors
American male stage actors
20th-century American male actors
American film directors
1878 births
1947 deaths
Members of The Lambs Club